Narva is a Mandal in Narayanpet district, Telangana.

Villages
The villages in Narwa mandal include:
 Bekkarapalle 	
 Chandragad 		
 Eklaspur 	
 Eerladinne 	
 Jakkannapalle 	
 Jangamreddipalle 	
 Kalwal 	
 Kanmanoor 	
 Kothapalli 	
 Kumarlingampally	
 Lankal 	
 Mittanandimalla 	
 Nagalkadumur 	
 Narwa
 Patherched 	
 Peddakadmoor 	
 Raikode 	
 Rampur 	
 Seepur 	
 Undekode 	
 Yamki

Mandals in Telangana
Narayanpet district